The Duke of York's Royal Military School, more commonly known as the Duke of York's, is a co-educational academy (for students aged 11 to 18) with military traditions in Guston, Kent.  Since becoming an academy in 2010, the school is now sponsored by the Ministry of Defence, and accepts applications from any student wishing to board.  Before 2010, only those students whose parents were serving or had served in the armed forces were eligible.

With the transition to academy status, the school became a state boarding school (it is a member of the State Boarding Forum and Boarding Schools Association). During this time, oversight transferred from the Ministry of Defence to the Department for Education.

The Duke of York's is steeped in military traditions and history, resulting in practices that include ceremonial parades and uniforms. It has a monitorial style of education modelled on the English public school system.

Notable alumni include senior generals (e.g. Sir Archibald Nye, Gary Coward and David Mark Cullen), musicians (Henry Lazarus), athletes (Maurice Colclough), scientists (e.g. Professors Paul Shaw, Timothy Foster, Kevin Allmark and Mark Gardiner) and clergymen (James Jones and Bill Ind).

History 
Founded in 1803 by act of Royal Warrant dating from 1801, the school was called the Royal Military Asylum until 1892. The school's primary purpose was to educate the orphans of British servicemen killed in the Napoleonic Wars of 1793–1815. Between 1803-1909 the Royal Military Asylum was located at what is now known as the Duke of York's Headquarters in Chelsea, London. The school was co-educational; this makes the Duke of York's the second co-educational boarding school in the United Kingdom. The first co-educational institution was the Royal Hibernian Military School in Dublin which was relocated and merged with Duke of York's after Ireland declared independence. Today, the Chelsea site is home to the Saatchi Gallery.

The school adopted the "Madras system of education" developed by Dr. Andrew Bell, to which Joseph Lancaster made certain improvements. In 1812, three African youths attended the school as teachers by the invitation of the Duke of Gloucester. They were then sent by the African Institution to Sierra Leone where they were employed as teachers by the Secretary of State for War and the Colonies, the Earl of Liverpool.

Between 1816-1840, the Asylum had a branch in Southampton which provided schooling for up to 400 military orphans and children serving soldiers of both sexes until 1823, whereupon the boys were transferred to Chelsea with the girls going to Southampton. A decline in the school numbers resulted in its closure in 1840. Starting in 1841, the buildings were taken over by the Ordnance Survey.

One of the more notable Commandants of the Royal Military Asylum was Major General Peter Brown. A veteran of the Napoleonic Wars, Brown was unusual in that he was promoted while he was in the post (from colonel to major general), which was highly unusual given the post was not an active command and his predecessors and successors were never promoted in post.

Many of the school's pupils carried out acts of gallantry in the wars that the British Army was involved. One such individual was John Shaul. Shaul was awarded the Victoria Cross for extraordinary bravery in the Boer War.

In 1892, the Royal Military Asylum was renamed The Duke of York's Royal Military School and ultimately became an all-boys school. In 1909, the school relocated to a new location constructed on the cliffs above Dover in Kent. For the duration of World War I (1914–1918), the school was evacuated to Hutton, near Brentwood, Essex. This provided the military authorities with a transit point in Dover for troops moved to and from the Western Front. In 1940, the school was evacuated to the Saunton Sands Hotel, Braunton, North Devon, while finally returning to Dover in 1946.

In 1994, the school re-admitted girls and returned to co-education.

The school's first civilian students were accepted in 2010 after the school was granted academy status.

Academic ratings 
Between 2007-2009 more than 90% of the pupils gained 5 or more GCSEs at grades A*-C (including English and Mathematics). More than 13% of grades were A*/A during the same period.

During this period (2007–2009) 19% of grades gained were A/B at AS level and 12% of grades were A/B at A2 level. A total of 32% of grades gained were passes at A2 level.

Exchanges with NATO member military schools 
The Duke of York's run student exchange programmes with military schools within NATO. Of these the most notable is the programme run with the school's French equivalent, the Lycée Militaire, in Aix-en-Provence. There are also placements for recent school leavers from respective military schools to assume assistant teaching posts at corresponding schools. The Duke of York's also has connections with Missouri Military Academy, Valley Forge Military Academy and College in Wayne, Pennsylvania, and Faujdarhat Cadet College located in Chittagong, Bangladesh.

Boarding houses 
The school is currently divided into twelve Houses, nine of which are named after famous British generals, one after a famous admiral of the Royal Navy, and another after a famous marshal of the Royal Air Force:

Junior houses (year 7) 
 Nelson
 Trenchard

Senior houses (years 8-11) 
 Haig
 Kitchener
 Roberts
 Wolseley
 Wellington
 Clive
 Wolfe
 Marlborough
 Alanbrooke

Years 12-13 
 Centenary House (opened in September 2010)

Notable alumni 

Alumni are known as "Dukies".

 Lieutenant-General Sir Gary Coward ret'd, CB, KBE, beginning his career in the Royal Artillery before transferring to the Army Air Corps, Coward was Quarter-Master General of the British Armed Forces, formerly Chief of Staff of the Permanent Joint Headquarters and before that General Officer Commanding United Kingdom Joint Helicopter Command. Coward is decorated with the Order of the Bath and the Order of the British Empire.
 Major General David Mark Cullen ret'd CB, OBE was a senior British Army officer. He served as the Assistant Chief of the General Staff from 2013 to 2015.
 Ramon Tikaram, stage and screen actor who shot to fame in BBC2 drama This Life, where he played a bi-sexual, Mexican bike courier called Ferdie.
 Maurice Colclough, rugby player for the England national rugby union team and British and Irish Lions.
 Judge Keith Raynor, a former Vice President of The Kosovo Specialist Chambers (KSC) in The Hague who was also appointed to the roster of international judges at the Chambers.
 Lieutenant-Colonel Nigel Wylde, QGM, Royal Army Ordnance Corps, Intelligence Corps, former-bomb disposal expert and intelligence operative decorated for gallantry who has cast doubt on the legitimacy of the state's moral conduct in anti-terrorist campaigns from the 1970s to the present day. Wylde has appeared as an expert witness to the Barron Inquiry on the Dublin and Monaghan bombings of 17 May 1974.
 Sir James Stuart Jones, British Anglican clergyman and former Bishop of Liverpool.
 Bill Ind, British Anglican clergyman and formerly Bishop of Truro.
 Professor Arthur Buller, ERD, FRCP, Professor of Physiology, University of Bristol, 1965–1982, Emeritus Professor, since 1982; Chief Scientist, Department of Health and Social Security, 1978–81, and Fellow of the Royal College of Physicians
 Lieutenant General Sir Archibald Nye, GCSI, GCIE, KCB, KBE, MC, Vice-Chief of the Imperial General Staff as well as being involved in Operation Mincemeat, Governor of Madras in 1946, UK High Commissioner in Delhi from 1948 to 1952, High Commissioner to Canada from 1952 to 1956, chairman of the Nye Committee.
 Detective Inspector D.H.C. Nixon, Metropolitan Police, subject of the novel Nick of the River by Anthony Richardson and the accompanying television series.
 Lieutenant Peter Cartwright, Royal Scots Fusiliers, Special Air Service, died trying to save three comrades from drowning on training exercise during the Malayan Emergency. Despite pressure he was never awarded a posthumous gallantry medal.
 Colonel W.A.T. Bowly, CVO, CBE, MC, President of the DYRMS Old Boy's Association 1937–1945, as well as being Headmaster of the DYRMS during World War II, recipient of the Royal Victorian Order, the Order of the British Empire and decorated for gallantry in combat during World War I.
 William Henry Debroy Somers, inter-war composer, lyricist, blues and jazz musician who formed the Savoy Hotel Orpheans, performed on Radio Luxembourg and Radio Normandy, and performed in the Horlicks Show to rival the Ovaltineys , as well as performing in the Royal Variety Performance.
 Group Captain George Gardiner, DSO, DFC, Légion d'honneur, Croix de Guerre, Croix de Chevalier, Royal Irish Regiment, Queen's Lancers, Royal Flying Corps, Royal Air Force, fighter ace in World War I.
 Lieutenant George William Hanna, MM, Duke of Wellington's Regiment, infantryman in the Boer War and World War I.
 Henry Lazarus, the premier British clarinet virtuoso of the nineteenth century and professor of the Royal Academy of Music
 Thomas Sullivan, professor of the Royal Military School of Music, Kneller Hall and father of the composer Sir Arthur Sullivan of Gilbert and Sullivan fame
 Roger Tomlinson, master of British military music, who ended his career in the rank of Lieutenant Colonel as Senior Director of Music of the British Army
 Alfred James Phasey, a star musician during the Victorian age, including playing with the Philharmonic Society of London (progenitor of the Royal Philharmonic Society, professor of the Royal Army College of Music.
 Ann Vanpine, mill worker turned teacher to the benefit of her community and testament to the spirit of service encouraged at the Duke of York's; moreover Vanpine was a pupil in the earliest years of the school (1821–1825) and in a time of extremely limited opportunities for orphans but especially women, making her accomplishments the more remarkable.
 John Francis David Shaul, recipient of the Victoria Cross as a Corporal of the Highland Light Infantry at the Battle of Magersfontein, 11 December 1899. Corporal Shaul's bravery and humane conduct were so conspicuous that, not only was he noticed by his own officer, but even those of other regiments remarked upon it. Corporal Shaul was in charge of stretcher bearers and was most conspicuous in dressing the wounds of the injured. He was born in King's Lynn on 11 September 1873. He received his VC from the Duke of York at Pietermaritzburg on 14 August 1901.
 Mat Gilbert, Bath Rugby, Llanelli Scarlets and England Deaf Rugby player.
 George Ridgwell, stage performer and minor composer/lyricist, later pioneer silent film-maker including the first Sherlock Holmes shorts
 Peter Birch, Actor. Roles have included Herr Ulrich in Auf Wiedersehen Pet, consultant Jack Hathaway in Casualty  and Arthur Eliott in The House of Eliott.
Lance Corporal Paul Lightfoot, Royal Corps of Signals, who was killed during the Falklands Campaign on 1 May 1982 while serving with 264 (SAS) Signal Squadron.

Notable masters 
 Regimental Sergeant Major Lincoln Perkins, British Empire Medal, Grenadier Guards, RSM at the Duke of York's Royal Military School 1979–2006, extensive career including Britain's East of Suez conflicts and service in the Royal Household. RSM Perkins, was one of the pallbearers to carry Sir Winston Churchill, in the funeral procession in 1965.
 Mr C.H. Connell, Head of English at DYRMS post World War II in the 1940s to late 1970s. Operative in the Special Operations Executive during World War II, Connell was also an author with at least seventeen novels and books published, plus a number of plays.
 Colonel W.A.T. Bowly, CVO, CBE, MC, Headmaster of the DYRMS during World War II, as well as being President of the DYRMS Old Boy's Association 1937–1945, recipient of the Royal Victorian Order, the Order of the British Empire and decorated for gallantry in combat during World War I.
 Lieutenant-Colonel S.G. Simpson, OBE, Headmaster of the Duke of York's Royal Military School 1922–1927, recipient of the Order of the British Empire, graduate of the universities of Cambridge, Lille, Paris and Heidelberg.
 Lieutenant-Colonel Harold Priestley, CMG, Medical Officer at the Duke of York's Royal Military School 1919–1922, recipient of the Order of St Michael and St George.
 Brigadier-General George Colborne Nugent, Irish Guards, Commandant of the Duke of York's Royal Military School 1913–1914, commanded the 5th London Brigade in World War I and was killed in action on 31 May 1915.
 Captain William Siborne, Adjutant of the Royal Military Asylum from 1843 to 1849, having previously demonstrated that the Duke of Wellington's account of his victory at the Battle of Waterloo was erroneous, and was in fact due in considerable part to Prussian assistance.
 Major General Lloyd Howell, CBE, Director of Army Education 1976–80, Headmaster [and commandant] 1967–72.

Dukies' Corner in Guston Churchyard 
Some pupils of the school are buried in the churchyard of St Martin of Tours church in the nearby village of Guston.

See also 
 The Royal Hospital School
 Queen Victoria School
 Gordon's School
 Association of Harrogate Apprentices

References

External links 
 Duke of York's Royal Military School
 Duke of York's Royal Military School Historical Archives
 Duke of York's Royal Military School Old Boys Association
 List of Duke of York's Old Boys & Girls on the Internet

Educational institutions established in 1803
Schools in Dover, Kent
Ministry of Defence (United Kingdom)
1803 establishments in the United Kingdom
Academies in Kent
Boarding schools in Kent
Secondary schools in Kent
Military schools in the United Kingdom